The Game Awards 2015 was an award show that honored the best video games of 2015. It was produced and hosted by Geoff Keighley at the Microsoft Theater in Los Angeles on December 3, 2015. The Witcher 3: Wild Hunt won the show's Game of the Year award. The event featured live performances from Chvrches, Ben Harper, Stephanie Joosten and Deadmau5.

Premieres 
The ceremony featured several game premieres, including Telltale Games's Batman: The Telltale Series and The Walking Dead: Michonne, Double Fine Productions's Psychonauts 2 and Harmonix's Rock Band VR. There were also new trailers for upcoming games, including Ubisoft's Far Cry Primal, Naughty Dog's Uncharted 4: A Thief's End, Remedy Entertainment's Quantum Break and Cloud Imperium Games's Star Citizen. Ports and remasters were also announced including an Xbox One port for Psyonix's Rocket League and a remastered version of Chair Entertainment's Shadow Complex.

The broadcast saw a total viewership of around 2.3 million.

Winners and nominees 
The nominees for The Game Awards 2015 were announced on November 13, 2015. Candidate games must have a commercial release date on or before November 24, 2015, in order to be eligible.

The winners were announced during the awards ceremony on December 3, 2015. Winners are shown first in bold, and indicated with a double-dagger (‡).

Jury-voted awards

Fan's choice awards

Honorary awards

Games with multiple nominations and awards

References

External links

2015 awards
2015 awards in the United States
2015 in Los Angeles
2015 in video gaming
The Game Awards ceremonies
2015 video game awards